Mane is a department or commune of Sanmatenga Province in central Burkina Faso. Its capital lies at the town of Mané.

Towns and villages

References

Departments of Burkina Faso
Sanmatenga Province